is a railway station on the Hanawa Line in the city of  Hachimantai, Iwate Prefecture, Japan, operated by East Japan Railway Company (JR East).

Lines

Station layout
Appi-Kōgen Station has one ground-level side platform serving a single bi-directional track. The station is unattended.

History
It was absorbed into the JR East network upon the privatization of JNR on April 1, 1987, and was renamed Appi-Kōgen Station on March 13, 1988.

Surrounding area
National Route 282
 Appi-Kōgen Golf Club and Ski Resort

See also
 List of Railway Stations in Japan

References

External links

  

Hanawa Line
Railway stations in Japan opened in 1961
Railway stations in Iwate Prefecture
Stations of East Japan Railway Company
Hachimantai, Iwate